Le lourd passé de Lagaffe, written and drawn by Franquin and Jidéhem, is an album of the original Gaston Lagaffe series, numbered R5. It is made up of 46 pages and was published by Dupuis. It consists of a series of one-strip gags.

Story
This album is made up of all the gags and illustrations that had not been previously published in album.

Background
This album was definitely the last album numbered "R", but another album of re-publication would follow latter, the Gaston Lagaffe #0.

Inventions
 light backpack: thanks to a helium cylinder bonbonne which blows up a balloon it's easier to carry burdens

References

 Gaston Lagaffe classic series on the official website
 Publication in Spirou on bdoubliées.com.

External links
Official website 

Comics by André Franquin
1986 graphic novels